Chinese Boxes is a 1984 British-West German crime mystery thriller film directed by Chris Petit and starring Will Patton and Robbie Coltrane. The film was partially German funded.

Cast
Will Patton as Marsh
Gottfried John as Zwemmer
Adelheid Arndt as Sarah
Robbie Coltrane as Harwood
Beate Jensen as Donna
Susanne Meierhofer as Eva
Jonathan Kinsler as Alan
L. M. Kit Carson as Crewcut
Chris Sievernich as Snake
Chris Petit as Gunsel (uncredited)
Michael Büttner as Policeman
Jochen von Vietinghoff	as Supplier

Production 
Filming for Chinese Boxes was filmed in East Berlin during 1984. The film's score was composed by a Stasi informer who also lived in East Berlin.

Release 
Chinese Boxes premiered on 29 November 1984 in the United Kingdom. Years later the movie was screened in 2013 as part of Petit's Museum of Loneliness project, also in the United Kingdom.

Reception
Critical reception was generally favorable. Derek Malcolm reviewed Chinese Boxes for The Guardian, commenting that it "looks good and is at least lively". The Independent remarked that the movie was "a quintessential Eighties riddle-thriller with a hint of Godard's Made in USA in its comic-strip flatness: it features a showdown in a paper-pulping yard, a foretaste of Petit's later preoccupation with pulped and discarded culture."

Chinese Boxes has also received a 2013 review from Chris Darke in Sight & Sound.

References

External links
 
 

West German films
British crime thriller films
1980s crime thriller films
British mystery thriller films
1980s mystery thriller films
German crime thriller films
German mystery thriller films
English-language German films
1980s English-language films
1980s British films
1980s German films